This is a list of the butterflies of family Papilionidae, or the "swallowtails", which are found in Europe.  This family of large and beautiful butterflies is poorly represented with only 14 species found within European borders, out of a total of 552 species of swallowtails found throughout the world. It is a part of List of the butterflies of Europe.

Checklist

Subfamily Parnassinae
 Southern festoon, Zerynthia polyxena
 Spanish festoon, Zerynthia rumina
 Eastern festoon, Allancastria cerisyi
Allancastria caucasica
 Allancastria cretica
 False Apollo, Archon apollinus
 Apollo, Parnassius apollo
 Small Apollo, Parnassius phoebus
 Clouded Apollo, Parnassius mnemosyne

Subfamily Papilioninae
 Swallowtail, Papilio machaon
 Corsican swallowtail, Papilio hospiton
 Southern swallowtail, Papilio alexanor
 Scarce swallowtail, Iphiclides podalirius
 Iberian scarce swallowtail, Iphiclides feisthamelii

See also
List of butterflies of Europe (Pieridae)

References

 
Europe
Butterflies
Europe, Papilionidae